Kenfig (Welsh: Cynffig) is a village and former borough in Bridgend, Wales.

Kenfig may also refer to:

 Cynffig/Kenfig SSSI, a Site of Special Scientific Interest which includes Kenfig Sands and its sand dunes near Kenfig
 Kenfig Castle, a ruined castle in Bridgend County Borough, Wales
 Kenfig Hill, a village in Bridgend County, South Wales
 Kenfig Hill RFC, a rugby union club
 Kenfig Pool, a national nature reserve situated near Porthcawl, Bridgend
 River Kenfig, a river in Wales, straddling the county boroughs of Neath Port Talbot and Bridgend

See also
 Cynfrig ap Madog, constable of Castell-y-Bere in the kingdom of Gwynedd, Wales